The Dranse d'Abondance is the upper part of the river Dranse in the French department of Haute-Savoie, a sub-tributary of the Rhône.

Geography 

It irrigates the Val d'Abondance.

In Bioge (a commune of Reyvroz), the river joins the Dranse at the confluence with Dranse de Morzine, which empties into Lake Geneva in the Delta de la Dranse National Nature Reserve between Thonon-les-Bains and Évian-les-Bains.

Traversed communes
Châtel
La Chapelle-d'Abondance
Abondance
Bonnevaux
Vacheresse
Chevenoz

Fish population

The Dranse d'Abondance stocks a population of brown trout from the Mediterranean. as are European bullheads. The fish are regulated by the AAPPMACG (Association Agréée pour la Pêche et la Protection du Milieu Aquatique du Chablais-Genevois).

References

External links
  Fédération de pêche de la Haute-Savoie
  Association Agréée pour la Pêche et la Protection du Milieu Aquatique du Chablais-Genevois

Rivers of Haute-Savoie
Rivers of France
Rivers of Auvergne-Rhône-Alpes